was a special Japanese spin-off magazine of Monthly Comic Blade published by Mag Garden that would feature both shōnen manga and shōjo manga, aiming at both boys and girls. The first issue was released on December 10, 2008. The release of the second issue, however, was postponed for unknown reasons.

Serialized Manga
 404 Not Found (Aya Sakamaki)
 Akumagari ~Uriel Gaiden~ (Seiuchirou Todono)
 docca (Yoshitomo Watanabe)
 Ima, Naguri ni Yukimasu (Moyamu Fujino)
 Kagerou Nostalgia ~ Shin Shou (Satomi Kubo) (from Monthly Comic Blade)
 Boukyaku no Cradle (Amnesia:Cradle) (Moyamu Fujino)
 Kodoku (Min Chishima, art by Machiko Mutou)
 Kodoku Gaiden (Machiko Mutou)
 Kyoraku Legion (Rin Asano)
 Nobunaga Santo (Miho Takano)
 R² [rise R to the second power] (Maki Hakoda)  (from Monthly Comic Blade)
 Rosetta Kara no Shoutaijou (Neko Asari, art by Hajime Sato) 
 Susukaburi (Kemuri Karakara)

References

External links
Mag Garden's Official Comic Blade Brownie website 

2008 establishments in Japan
2009 disestablishments in Japan
Defunct magazines published in Japan
Magazines established in 2008
Magazines disestablished in 2009
Mag Garden magazines
Magazines published in Tokyo
Monthly manga magazines published in Japan